Liubashivka Raion was a district in Odesa Oblast, Ukraine. Its administrative center was the urban-type settlement of Liubashivka. In 2001 its population was 33,000. The raion was abolished and its territory was merged into Podilsk Raion on 18 July 2020 as part of the administrative reform of Ukraine, which reduced the number of raions of Odesa Oblast to seven.  The last estimate of the raion population was 

The district was primarily Ukrainophone.

Important rivers within Liubashivskyi Raion included the Kodyma and Tylihul Rivers.

The railway connecting Odesa and Kropyvnytskyi crossed the Raion. It had two railway stations (in Zaplazy and Liubashivka).

The district also lied on 2 highways — route Kyiv – Odesa ; and route Chișinău (Moldova) - Kropyvnytskyi .

Urban-type settlements

 Liubashivka
 Zelenohirske

Natives

Kostyantyn Voloshchuk (1916 — 1945) — Hero of the World War II from Liubashivka.
Vasil Savenko — opera singer.
Pavlo Ulitsky (1923 — 1996) — Hero of the World War II.
Rostyslav Paletsky (1932 — 1978) —  artist.
Аlbin Havdzinsky —  artist.

References

Former raions of Odesa Oblast
1926 establishments in Ukraine
Ukrainian raions abolished during the 2020 administrative reform